Jair García Gamboa (born 25 October 1978) is a Mexican former footballer who played as a forward.

Club career
Garcia started his career with Monterrey, making his debut against Tigres in the Mexican Primera División on 27 February 1999. In 2000, he moved to Chivas Guadalajara, and then joined Puebla for the Clausura 2004 season. He subsequently had top-level spells with Santos Laguna (2005–06), Atlas (2007) and Cruz Azul (2008).

Prior to joining Lobos he played for Cruz Azul Hidalgo (2009 and 2010–11) and Indios de Ciudad Juárez (2010).

International career
He made three appearances for the Mexico national football team between 2001 and 2002, scoring one goal.

International goals

|- style="background:#dfe7ff;"
| 1. || January 19, 2002 || Pasadena, United States ||  || 1–0 || Win || 2002 CONCACAF Gold Cup
|}

References

External links
 

1978 births
Living people
Footballers from Guadalajara, Jalisco
Association football forwards
Mexican footballers
Mexico international footballers
2002 CONCACAF Gold Cup players
C.F. Monterrey players
C.D. Guadalajara footballers
Club Puebla players
Santos Laguna footballers
Indios de Ciudad Juárez footballers
Atlas F.C. footballers
Cruz Azul footballers
Club León footballers
Lobos BUAP footballers
C.F. Mérida footballers
Club Atlético Zacatepec players
Liga MX players